The list of Alberta by-elections includes every by-election held in the Canadian province of Alberta. By-elections occur whenever there is a vacancy in the Legislative Assembly, although an imminent general election may allow the vacancy to remain until the dissolution of parliament. Until 1926 incumbent members were required to recontest their seats upon being appointed to Cabinet. These Ministerial by-elections were almost always uncontested.

30th Legislative Assembly of Alberta 2019–present

29th Legislative Assembly of Alberta 2015–2019

28th Legislative Assembly of Alberta 2012–2015

27th Legislative Assembly of Alberta 2008–2012

26th Legislative Assembly of Alberta 2004–2008

25th Legislative Assembly of Alberta 2001–2004

24th Legislative Assembly of Alberta 1997–2001

23rd Legislative Assembly of Alberta 1993–1997

22nd Legislative Assembly of Alberta 1989–1993

21st Legislative Assembly of Alberta 1986–1989

20th Legislative Assembly of Alberta 1982–1986

19th Legislative Assembly of Alberta 1979–1982

18th Legislative Assembly of Alberta 1975–1979
no by-elections

17th Legislative Assembly of Alberta 1971–1975

16th Legislative Assembly of Alberta 1967–1971

15th Legislative Assembly of Alberta 1963–1967

14th Legislative Assembly of Alberta 1959–1963

13th Legislative Assembly of Alberta 1955–1959

12th Legislative Assembly of Alberta 1952–1955

11th Legislative Assembly of Alberta 1948–1952

10th Legislative Assembly of Alberta 1944–1948

9th Legislative Assembly of Alberta 1940–1944

† Won by acclamation

8th Legislative Assembly of Alberta 1935–1940

† Won by acclamation

7th Legislative Assembly of Alberta 1930–1935

6th Legislative Assembly of Alberta 1926–1930

5th Legislative Assembly of Alberta 1921–1926

† Won by acclamation

4th Legislative Assembly of Alberta 1917–1921

† Won by acclamation

3rd Legislative Assembly of Alberta 1913–1917

† Won by acclamation

2nd Legislative Assembly of Alberta 1909–1913

† Won by acclamation

*Patterson was elected with Conservative support and sat as a Conservative in the Legislature

1st Legislative Assembly of Alberta 1905–1909

† Won by acclamation

See also
 List of federal by-elections in Canada

References

 

By-elections
Provincial by-elections in Alberta
Elections, by-elections
Alberta, by-ele